Wadaiko Yamato 和太鼓倭　is a Japanese musical group of taiko drummers founded in 1993 by Masa Ogawa.
In Japanese, the word 和太鼓 "wadaiko" translates as "Japanese drum" and "Yamato" was the former name of the city of Nara, the group's birthplace.

Since its creation, the group has made over two thousand, six hundred (2600) live performances to over one million people in more than 50 countries in Asia, Europe, and the Americas. The group's international debut occurred in 1998 at the Edinburgh Festival Fringe, where the group was awarded the "Spirit of the Fringe" award. The following year, the group embarked on three international tours, covering South America, six countries in Europe, and Israel.
On September 28 and 29, 2007 the Wadaiko Yamato musical group performed at the 2007 Universal Forum of Cultures in Monterrey, Mexico.

References

External links
Official website Japanese
Official website English

Musical groups established in 1993
Taiko groups